John Joseph Scanlan (May 24, 1906 – January 31, 1997) was an American Prelate of the Roman Catholic Church.  He served as the second bishop of the Diocese of Honolulu in Hawaii from 1968 to 1981.  He previously served as an auxiliary bishop of the same diocese from 1954 to 1968.

Biography

Early life 
John Scanlan was born on May 24, 1906 in Iniscarra in County Cork, Ireland. He trained at All Hallows College in Dublin.  Scanlan was ordained by Bishop John Francis Norton for the Archdiocese of San Francisco on June 22, 1930 in Dublin. After his ordination, Scanlan served in pastoral positions at parishes in Oakland, Berkeley and San Jose. He directed the Archdiocesan Council of Catholic Men and taught religion in high school.

Auxiliary Bishop and Bishop of Honolulu 
On July 8, 1954, Pope Pius XII appointed Scanlan as an auxiliary bishop of the Diocese of  Honolulu and titular bishop of Cenae.  He was consecrated on September 21, 1954 by Archbishop John Joseph Mitty.  On November 10, 1967, Scanlan was appointed apostolic administrator  and took charge of the administration of the diocese.

On March 6, 1968, Pope Paul VI appointed Scanlan as bishop of the Diocese of Honolulu.  

On June 30, 1981, Scanlan retired but continued to be active as bishop emeritus. John Scanlan died in San Rafael, California, on January 31, 1997.

References

1906 births
1997 deaths
People from County Cork
Alumni of All Hallows College, Dublin
Roman Catholic bishops of Honolulu
Participants in the Second Vatican Council
Irish emigrants to the United States
20th-century Roman Catholic bishops in the United States